Star Wars: Tales from the Galaxy's Edge is a virtual reality first-person shooter game originally released on November 19, 2020 for the Oculus Quest systems. The graphics were designed by ILMxLab.

The game is a virtual reality experience inspired by Star Wars: Galaxy's Edge (known in canon as the Black Spire spaceport or Black Spire Outpost on the planet Batuu) land at Disneyland Park and Disney's Hollywood Studios.

Gameplay
Players crash land on Batuu after encountering the Guavian Death Gang led by the intimidating Tara Rashin. In between blaster fire, players can talk to bartender Seezelslak and find themselves in the middle of his stories that span different eras of the Star Wars timeline.

The next installment, subtitled Last Call, features treasure dealer Dok-Ondar (first mentioned in Solo: A Star Wars Story) who sends players on new adventures exploring the darkest parts of Black Spire Outpost.

Reception 

Star Wars: Tales from the Galaxy's Edge received mostly positive reviews, with some critics disliking the game's short length. It has a score of 74 on OpenCritic. Destructoid's Chris Carter enjoyed the shooting mechanics, and described it as "still more captivating than the recent trilogy."

On September 15, 2021, the downloadable content Last Call was released. Many reviewers said the release rounded out the initial game. AndroidCentral gave it a 4.5 star rating out of 5. Geeks of Color called it "the ultimate playground for Star Wars fans." TechRadar claimed that with the DLC release the title "has firmly cemented its place as one of the best Star Wars games out there."

Star Wars: Tales from the Galaxy's Edge: Last Call was nominated for VR Game of the Year by the VR Awards 2022.

References

2020 video games
First-person shooters
Meta Quest games
Oculus Rift games
PlayStation 5 games
PlayStation VR2 games
Star Wars video games
Video games based on Walt Disney Parks and Resorts attractions
Video games developed in the United States
Video games with downloadable content